Kal Bid may refer to:
Kal Bid, Khuzestan (كل بيد - Kal Bīd)
Kal Bid, Markazi (كل بيد - Kal Bīd)